Watson's Choice is a 1955 mystery detective novel by the British writer Gladys Mitchell. It is the twenty eight in her long-running series featuring the psychoanalyst and amateur detective Mrs Bradley.

Synopsis
The wealthy Sir Bohun Chantrey hosts a party to celebrate the anniversary of Sherlock Holmes, with whom he is obsessed. However his relatives are astonished when he announces he is getting married again.

References

Bibliography
 Klein, Kathleen Gregory. Great Women Mystery Writers: Classic to Contemporary. Greenwood Press, 1994.
 Reilly, John M. Twentieth Century Crime & Mystery Writers. Springer, 2015.

1955 British novels
Novels by Gladys Mitchell
British crime novels
Novels set in England
Novels set in London
British detective novels
Michael Joseph books